was a waka poet and Japanese nobleman active in the early Kamakura period.

He was also a major contributor to the Shinchokusen Wakashū anthology.

In 1222AD he was appointed as the Chancellor of the Realm and later entered in religion in 1231AD.

Poetry 
The ninety-sixth poem reads:

See also 
Saionji family
List of Daijō-daijin

References

External links 
E-text of his poems in Japanese.

Japanese poets
1171 births
1244 deaths
Hyakunin Isshu poets